Ashash, Aachach, Achache or Aachache (also referred to as Deir Ashash )  is a village in Zgharta District, in the Northern Governorate of Lebanon. Its population is solely Maronite Catholic

Ashash is a small Catholic Lebanese Village located north of Zgharta, it has two Schools; Ecole Al Amana Achache and St. George's School Achache. The head of the Achache municipality ( رئيس البلدية ) is Christo Naffah.

Throughout the month of September 1975, battles broke out in the north of Lebanon. On September 10, Al Saaka Palestinian-Syrian forces attacked the village of Deir Ashash and killed three priests. All residents had to flee.

References

External links
Ehden Family Tree 

Populated places in the North Governorate
Zgharta District
Maronite Christian communities in Lebanon
Sunni Muslim communities in Lebanon